Succinate-semialdehyde dehydrogenase (acylating) (succinyl-coA reductase, coenzyme-A-dependent succinate-semialdehyde dehydrogenase) is an enzyme with systematic name succinate semialdehyde:NADP+ oxidoreductase (CoA-acylating). This enzyme catalyses the following chemical reaction

 succinate semialdehyde + CoA + NADP+  succinyl-CoA + NADPH + H+

Catalyses the NADPH-dependent reduction of succinyl-CoA to succinate semialdehyde.

References

External links 
 

EC 1.2.1